Choi Kwang-hee (born May 17, 1984) is a South Korea football player who plays for Busan IPark as a right winger, wing back or full back.

References

External links

1984 births
Living people
South Korean footballers
Ulsan Hyundai FC players
Jeonbuk Hyundai Motors players
Busan IPark players
K League 1 players
K League 2 players
Ansan Mugunghwa FC players
Sportspeople from Ulsan

Association football midfielders